Heliophanus malus is a jumping spider species in the genus Heliophanus.  It was first described by Wanda Wesołowska in 1986 and lives in Israel and Syria.

References

Spiders described in 1986
Fauna of Syria
Salticidae
Spiders of Asia
Taxa named by Wanda Wesołowska